Laurel S. Braitman (born February 11, 1978) is an American science historian, writer, and a TED Fellow.

She is Writer-in-Residence at the Stanford School of Medicine and a Contributing Writer for Pop Up Magazine.
She is also an affiliate artist at the Headlands Center for the Arts. Her work has appeared in The Guardian,  The Wall Street Journal, Fast Company, The New Inquiry, Salon, and a variety of other publications.

Laurel frequently collaborates with visual artists and musicians like Black Prairie to create concerts for all-animal audiences, such as wolves.

Biography 

Braitman was born and raised on a citrus farm near Ventura in southern California. She majored in Biology and Writing at Cornell University, where she was a member of the Quill and Dagger society and graduated summa cum laude.  She worked as an intern in the Weekend Edition Saturday program at NPR.  She received a John S. Hennessey scholarship to pursue graduate studies at the Massachusetts Institute of Technology, wherein 2013, she received her Ph.D. in the history and anthropology of science. Braitman lives in San Francisco, California.

She is the author of Animal Madness: How Anxious Dogs, Compulsive Parrots, and Elephants in Recovery Help Us Understand Ourselves, which was published in October 2015. In the book, Braitman shows through a wealth of research that nonhuman animals are startlingly similar to us in how they are affected by mental illness, and in what methods best help them recover.

Bibliography

Books 
 Animal Madness: How Anxious Dogs, Compulsive Parrots, and Elephants in Recovery Help Us Understand Ourselves (2015)

Essays and reporting

References

External links

 Interview with Laurel Braitman discussing her book "Animal Madness" on the 7th Avenue Project radio show
 
 TED Talk: Laurel Braitman: Depressed dogs, cats with OCD — what animal madness means for us humans (TEDSalon NY2014)
 Laurel Braitman's website
 Interview with Laurel Braitman discussing "Animal Madness" on NPR Weekend Edition
 Interview with Laurel Braitman on TED Radio Hour
  
 
 
 

Living people
MIT School of Humanities, Arts, and Social Sciences alumni
American non-fiction writers
Cornell University alumni
1978 births
National Geographic people
Women science writers
TED Fellows
21st-century American women writers
People from Ventura County, California
Writers from California